Swing State is a 2016 American comedy film written and directed by Jonathan Sheldon and starring Alex Beh, Taryn Manning, Billy Zane, Sean Astin and Angela Kinsey.

Cast
Alex Beh as Ethan Smith
Taryn Manning as Adrienne Lockhart
Angela Kinsey as Susan Davis
Sean Astin as Bob Bernard
Billy Zane as Governor Richard Sollow
Elaine Hendrix as Ann Alcott
Nick Loeb as Peter Dennon
Shane Black as Luke
Ted Levine as Rouge Holmes
Jake Busey as Woody Woodrow
Lydia Hearst as Julia Davis
Lorraine Ziff as Mary Sue

Release
The film was released on iTunes on November 1, 2016.

Reception
Simi Horowitz of Film Journal International gave the film a positive review and wrote, "Nonetheless, Swing State generally scores, and if it’s any indication, Sheldon’s next film should prove winning."

References

External links
 
 

2016 films
2010s English-language films